Vladimir Alexandrovich Kucherenko (born December 21, 1966), better known by the pen name Maxim Kalashnikov (Макси́м Кала́шников), is a Russian writer, publicist, and political activist.

His writings focus on praising the Soviet Union and its political and economic system from a Russian nationalist perspective, criticizing the Russian government, and discussing the perceived NATO (particularly American) threat to Russia and the likelihood that this antagonism will result in a nuclear war between Russia and NATO.

Ideology and criticism

Maxim Kalashnikov is a Russian nationalistic agitator. As an expert in Russian history, economics, and military, he criticizes modern Russia and praises the Soviet system, or more precisely what it was under Joseph Stalin and what it could have become without Leonid Brezhnev and Mikhail Gorbachev. He is an advocate of "a federated Russian Empire" consisting of the Russian Federation, Ukraine, parts of Belarus, Moldova's breakaway Transnistria, and Georgia's Abkhazia and South Ossetia. He has described himself as a supporter of "dismemberment" of Georgia and creation of Russian-allied enclaves in its territory.

Kalashnikov has often been criticized for lack of objectivity and abuse of sentimentalism in his writings. Kalashnikov targets primarily younger Russian. He has also been criticized for making numerous contradictions. For example, in some of his writing, Kalashnikov praises Stalin and the Soviet system, yet in other writings, he espouses sharp anti-communist arguments.

In September 2009 President of Russia Dmitry Medvedev urged the government to study Kalashnikov's ideas for speeding the development of the country’s innovative economy posted at LiveJournal.

Major works
Московский спрут The Muscovite Octopus (1993)
Москва — империя тьмы Moscow – the Empire of Darkness (1995)
Сломанный меч империи The Broken Sword of the Empire (1998/2000/2002)
Битва за небеса  The Battle for Skies (2000/2002)
Гнев орка The Wrath of the Orc (in collaboration with Yuri Krupnov 2003)
Оседлай молнию Ride the Lightning (in collaboration with Yuri Krupnov 2003)
Вперед, в СССР-2 Towards USSR 2.0 (2003)
Третий проект: книга-расследование в 3 тт. The Third Project: An Investigation Book in 3 Volumes (in collaboration with Sergey Kugushev 2005/2006)
Код Путина The Putin Code (2005)
Война с Големом The War Against the Golem (2006)
Сверхчеловек говорит по-русски The Übermensch Speaks Russian  (in collaboration with Rodion Rusov, 2006)
Крещение огнём The Baptism of Fire (2007)

References

1966 births
Living people
20th-century Russian journalists
20th-century Russian writers
21st-century Russian journalists
21st-century Russian writers
Moscow State University alumni
People from Ashgabat
Russian bloggers
Russian male journalists
Russian male writers
Russian nationalists
Russian political activists
Russian political writers
Turkmenistan people of Russian descent
Neo-Stalinists
20th-century pseudonymous writers
21st-century pseudonymous writers